Echinosaura brachycephala is a species of lizard in the family Gymnophthalmidae. It is endemic to Ecuador.

References

Echinosaura
Reptiles of Ecuador
Endemic fauna of Ecuador
Reptiles described in 2004
Taxa named by Gunther Köhler
Taxa named by Wolfgang Böhme (herpetologist)
Taxa named by Andreas Schmitz